John W. Semple is a Canadian Scientist at St. Michael's Hospital and a Professor of Pharmacology at the University of Toronto.  He was born in Windsor, Ontario in 1959 and received his PhD in Immunology at Queen's University at Kingston, Ontario.  In 1991, Semple, along with John Freedman, discovered a T helper cell defect in patients with the bleeding disorder called immune thrombocytopenic purpura (ITP).  ITP is the condition of having a low platelet count (thrombocytopenia) and most causes appear to be related to antibodies against platelets. Very low platelet counts can lead to a bleeding diathesis and purpura. The T cell defect was initially shown to be an exaggerated interleukin-2 response when T cells were cultured with platelets in vitro.  Subsequently, this cytokine abnormality was shown by others to be responsible for many of the autoimmune mechanisms causing the disorder.).

The importance of understanding the T cell defects in ITP is that novel therapies aimed at these cells may significantly benefit patients with ITP.

References

External links
  John Semple's laboratory homepage
 John Semple's biography at St. Michael's Hospital
 John Semple's biography at the University of Toronto

1959 births
Canadian medical researchers
Canadian immunologists
Living people
Medical educators
Queen's University at Kingston alumni
People from Windsor, Ontario
Scientists from Toronto
Academic staff of the University of Toronto
20th-century Canadian scientists
21st-century Canadian scientists